Ilexia is a genus of geometrid moths in the family Geometridae. There is one described species in Ilexia, I. intractata.

References

Further reading

External links

 

Caberini
Articles created by Qbugbot